Glenn Chris Anderson (born October 2, 1960) is a Canadian former professional ice hockey player who played 16 seasons in the National Hockey League (NHL) for the Edmonton Oilers, Toronto Maple Leafs, New York Rangers, and St. Louis Blues. Anderson was known to have a knack for stepping up in big games, which garnered him the reputation of a "money" player. His five playoff overtime goals rank third in NHL history, while his 17 playoff game-winning goals put him fifth all-time. During the playoffs, Anderson accumulated 93 goals, 121 assists, and 214 points, the fourth, ninth, and fourth most in NHL history. Anderson is also first all-time in regular season game winning goals in Oilers history with 72.

At a young age, Anderson admired the European aspects of the game. He was known to have a liking for participating in international tournaments, more so than his NHL contemporaries. When he was drafted by the Oilers in 1979, he chose to play for Team Canada at the 1980 Winter Olympics instead of immediately joining the Oilers. Anderson won gold at the 1984 and the 1987 Canada Cup and he was a silver medalist at the 1989 Ice Hockey World Championships. During his NHL career, Anderson was part of six Stanley Cup winning teams (he won five as a member of the Oilers and one as a member of the Rangers) and he was a participant at four All-Star Games. He is one of only seven Oilers players to have won all five Cups in franchise history. In 1996 he played for Team Canada in the Spengler Cup Tournament, often referred to as the Stanley Cup of Europe. Despite having the flu with a high fever Glenn rallied as soon as his skates were laced and was voted unanimously as the MVP of the tournament. They hoisted the Cup for Canada and took the lounging photo on the ice surrounding the Spengler Cup which was Glenn’s idea when the Oilers won their first cup and has since become a tradition. Anderson was inducted into the Hockey Hall of Fame on November 10, 2008 and his jersey number, 9, was retired by the Oilers on January 18, 2009.

Background
Anderson was born in Vancouver and raised in Burnaby, British Columbia. His father, Magnus, was a Norwegian  immigrant, and his mother, Anne, was of Ukrainian origin. He has two brothers (Allan and David) and a sister (Pam). He is married to Susan Anderson and together they have a daughter, Autumn Anderson. As a young child, Glenn did not enjoy the game of ice hockey. His first ever goal was in his own net. However, as he grew older, and developed his skills, Anderson's love of the game increased over time. As a youth, he and teammate Ken Berry played in the 1972 Quebec International Pee-Wee Hockey Tournament with a minor ice hockey team from Burnaby.

Growing up, Anderson played hockey with his childhood friends, the Berry boys, Andy Hill and Mike Fox, (who became an award winning actor). Anderson's hockey idol was his favourite player, Russian Alexander Yakushev, whom he had watched play during the 1972 Summit Series.  Glenn eventually produced the one hour acclaimed documentary "To Russia With Love", released in September 2012, about the way Russia changed the Canadian ice hockey game.

Playing career

Early career
Anderson began his junior hockey career with the Bellingham Blazers of the British Columbia Junior Hockey League (BCJHL) during the 1977–78 season. In 64 games, Anderson recorded 62 goals, 69 assists, and 131 points, the third most goals and eighth most points in the league. To top off his lone season in the BCJHL, he was named to the league's Second All-Star Team.

In 1978–79, Anderson was recruited to play for the hockey team of the University of Denver in the National Collegiate Athletic Association (NCAA) by Marshall Johnston, the University team's head coach. Anderson played in 41 games, and led the team in points with 55.

In the 1979 NHL Entry Draft Anderson was drafted 69th overall by the Edmonton Oilers of the National Hockey League (NHL). He opted to play for Team Canada during the 1980 Winter Olympics in Lake Placid. Father David Bauer, in charge of the national team program, accepted Anderson. Father Bauer's influence on Anderson was significant as he would cite him as a major reason for his later success. The team toured the world playing different opponents in preparation for the Olympics. The practice Anderson received during this time helped "greatly improve" his skills. Anderson scored four points in six games during the tournament.

Edmonton Oilers (1980–1991)
The Canadian National Team program was discontinued in the Fall of 1980. Facing a choice of whether to rejoin the University of Denver, or to join the Oilers, Anderson chose the latter.  Making his professional debut with the Oilers, Anderson recorded 30 goals, 23 assists, and 53 points in 58 games in his first season. The Oilers made the playoffs that year and defeated the Montreal Canadiens in the preliminary round, three games to none. This was deemed a huge upset since the Canadiens had finished eleven spots higher than the Oilers in the overall standings. The Oilers moved on to the quarter-finals where they were defeated in six games by the eventual Stanley Cup champions, New York Islanders. During the playoff run, Anderson scored 12 points in 9 games, establishing himself as a "fierce" playoff performer. Anderson's sophomore season saw him record career highs in both assists and points with 67 and 105, respectively. His team jumped from fourth place to first place in the Smythe Division. In the playoffs, the Oilers were the victims of one of the biggest upsets in hockey history.

The following season, Anderson tallied 48 goals and 56 assists for a total of 104 points to help the Oilers remain atop their division. In the playoffs, the Oilers managed to advance to the Stanley Cup Finals for the first time in franchise history. Anderson and his team were matched up against the Islanders who were looking for a fourth consecutive Stanley Cup victory. During the Finals, Anderson had several noted run-ins with Islanders goaltender Billy Smith. During game one, a slash on Anderson's knee earned Smith a two-minute slashing penalty. In game four, when the two crashed into each other, Smith's dive resulted in referee Andy Van Hellemond handing a five-minute penalty to Anderson. The season ended in disappointment for the Oilers as they were defeated in four games in a best of seven series. Anderson's team would cite the loss as a valuable lesson in their quest for their first Stanley Cup.

The Oilers again repeated as division champions in 1983–84. Anderson set a career high in goals with 54 and he made his first All-Star Game appearance. In the playoffs, the Oilers made their second consecutive Finals appearance. Once again, Anderson and his team faced the Islanders who were now looking to become the second team in NHL history to win five consecutive Stanley Cups.  This time though, the Oilers emerged victorious in five games. This marked the ending of the Islanders' dynasty and the beginning of the Oilers' dynasty. Anderson scored 17 points in the playoffs.

At the beginning of the 1984–85 season, Anderson signed an eight-year contract with the Oilers. Anderson recorded 42 goals and 81 points and once more his team were the division champions. Anderson was also selected to play in the All-Star Game. For the third straight season, the Oilers reached the Finals. The Oilers defeated their opponent, the Philadelphia Flyers, in five games. Anderson set a career high in assists with 16 during the playoff run. The 1985–86 season saw Anderson score 54 goals, 48 assists, adding up to 102 points. This was the second time Anderson had reached the 50 goal plateau in his career and the third time he had reached the 100 point plateau. He was also selected to play in his third consecutive All-Star Game. For the fifth consecutive season, the Oilers sat atop the Smythe Division. However, the Oilers were eliminated in the division finals by the Calgary Flames on an own goal by defenceman Steve Smith. The loss did not seem to faze Anderson and his team, as they won their third Cup the next season by beating the Flyers once again, but this time in seven games. Anderson set career highs in goals (14), points (27) and PIM (59) during the playoff run.

The Oilers failed to win the division title in 1987–88 for the first time since the 1981–82 season, as they finished runner-up to the Calgary Flames. Anderson scored 88 points during the season, and he was selected to play in the All-Star Game. In the midst of the 1988 playoffs, Anderson's friend, Dr. George Varvis, died after falling into Anderson's pool. His friend's death inspired his on-ice production. He scored 9 goals, and 16 assists for a total of 25 points to help the Oilers win their fourth Cup. His 16 assists tied a career high. After being eliminated from the playoffs, Anderson chose to play for Team Canada at the World Championships in Sweden. Anderson credits his time in Sweden for rejuvenating his love of the game. 
 
Looking to rebound after a disappointing season, Anderson and his team made a surprise appearance in the Finals. The Oilers defeated their opponents, the Boston Bruins, in five games to win their fifth Stanley Cup. Anderson scored 22 points and became one of only seven players to be a part of the entire Oilers dynasty.  Wanting to rebuild the team with a younger core, the Oilers were involved in a blockbuster trade at the end of the 1991–92 season with the Toronto Maple Leafs that included seven players. Anderson, along with Grant Fuhr and Craig Berube, were sent to Toronto in exchange for Scott Thornton, Vincent Damphousse, Luke Richardson, Peter Ing and future considerations.

During his time with the Oilers, Anderson scored 417 goals, 489 assists, and 906 points, ranking him third, fourth, and fourth most respectively in franchise history. His 183 playoff points are fourth all-time in franchise history and his 126 powerplay goals are the most in franchise history.

Late career (1991–1997)
Anderson spent two seasons and part of another with the Maple Leafs. He recorded consecutive 20-goal seasons, and he reached the career milestone of 1000 points with them. During the Maple Leafs playoff run in 1992–93, Anderson recorded 18 points in 21 games, including an overtime goal in Game 5 of the Western Conference Finals against the Kings, which gave the Leafs a 3–2 series lead but turned out to be their last win of the season.

In 1993–94, Anderson played 73 games with the Maple Leafs before being traded to the New York Rangers for Mike Gartner. In New York, Anderson was reunited with many of his former teammates from his days in Edmonton. The Rangers featured six former Oilers, including future Hall of Famer and Anderson's long-time friend and linemate Mark Messier. The Rangers qualified for the playoffs and were able to advance to the Finals. Matched up against the Vancouver Canucks, the Rangers defeated them in seven games. This was the Rangers' first Stanley Cup victory since 1940. After being held scoreless in the previous rounds, Anderson scored three playoff goals in the Finals, two of them being game-winners. This would be Anderson's sixth Stanley Cup victory.

Due to the 1994–95 NHL lock-out, Anderson went to Europe to play hockey. He played with the Augsburger Panther of the Deutsche Eishockey Liga in Germany and the Lukko Rauma of the SM-liiga in Finland, as well as the Canadian National Team. After the lock-out was resolved, Anderson signed as a free agent with the St. Louis Blues and played 42 regular season and playoff games combined. At the end of the season, Anderson did not re-sign with the Blues. After playing part of the next season with Augsburger and the National Team again, Anderson signed with the Canucks as a free agent. His reasons for joining the team were because of former Oiler teammate Esa Tikkanen already playing there, and a desire to finish his career in his hometown. However, Anderson never played for the Canucks as the Oilers picked him up on re-entry waivers. Anderson expressed his disappointment at these turn of events, as he wanted to play in Vancouver instead. He spent 17 games with the Oilers, before being put on waivers that same season. The Blues claimed him, and he spent his last days in the NHL with them. The 1996–97 season saw Anderson return to Europe and play with HC La Chaux-de-Fonds of the National League A in Switzerland and with Bolzano HC of the Alpenliga in Italy.

International career
Anderson was known to have a liking for participating in international competitions. His first test at the international stage was during the 1980 Winter Olympics in Lake Placid, New York. Canada finished sixth in the tournament while Anderson scored four points in six games. Later on, Anderson credited the practice he received in preparation for the Olympics as a key to his future success in the NHL.

Anderson was chosen to participate in the 1984 Canada Cup. The roster included eight of Anderson's teammates from the Edmonton Oilers. Canada advanced to the finals and defeated Sweden 2–0 in a best of three series to win the Cup. Anderson scored five points during the tournament. The 1987 Canada Cup also saw Anderson participate. Once more, Canada reached the finals, but this time they were up against the Soviet Union. The finals required all three games as Canada defeated the Soviet Union. The first two games needed overtime and all three had a final score of 6–5. Anderson recorded three points during the tournament.

In 1989, Anderson played at the Ice Hockey World Championships for the first time. With four points in six games, Anderson helped Canada win the silver medal, as the Soviets took home the gold. Three years later, Anderson made his second and final appearance at the World Ice Hockey Championships, this time in Czechoslovakia. Canada was eliminated by Finland in the quarterfinals by a score of 4–3. Anderson registered three points during the tournament.

Wanting to participate in the Olympics again, Anderson did what he could to play at the 1994 Winter Olympics in Lillehammer, Norway. He negotiated a clause with his team, the Toronto Maple Leafs, to grant him the right to play for Team Canada. This was not enough as Anderson also had to obtain permission from the league. The league had instituted a policy that only players with less than one year of National Hockey League experience could join and therefore turned down his request. The league's decision caused an outrage in Canada. Canada won silver as they lost the gold medal game to Sweden.

Playing style

Anderson was noted for his aggressive "to the net" playing style, typifying the NHL power forward in the early 1980s. He credits coach Clare Drake's drills during his time with the Olympic team for his love of driving the net. He also liked to stay behind the net and pass to his teammates in front of the goal for scoring chances. Noted as a "money" player, Anderson was able to elevate his game in high pressure situations. He scored five playoff overtime goals and 17 playoff game-winning goals, good for third and fifth all-time in NHL history. During the playoffs, Anderson accumulated 93 goals, 121 assists, and 214 points, the fourth, ninth, and fourth most in NHL history. In addition, his 72 regular season game-winning goals with the Oilers put him first all time in franchise history.

Anderson was inducted into the Hockey Hall of Fame on November 10, 2008 in the players category. His jersey number 9 was retired on January 18, 2009, by the Oilers, before a game against the Phoenix Coyotes. The date for Anderson's number retirement was specifically selected because his former Oilers teammates, Wayne Gretzky and Grant Fuhr, were serving as the Coyotes' head coach and goaltending coach respectively at the time.

Glenn resides in Manhattan, New York with his wife Susan, and their daughter, Autumn. Glenn is retired, but teaches and runs fantasy camps, which give fans a chance to play hockey alongside him. Anderson also appears as a commentator and analyst for many programs as well as the New York Rangers.

Anderson was a participant in season one of Battle of the Blades. Anderson and his partner, Isabelle Brasseur, were the second pair to be eliminated from the competition. For their efforts, Brasseur's charity, the Heart and Stroke Foundation of Canada, and Anderson's charity, the Cross Cancer Institute, each received a $12,500 donation. Anderson or “Andy” as his hockey team brothers call him, did not shave the toe pick down on the figure skates as most of the hockey players had done and he tripped on it trying to be authentic despite never having skated on figure skates.

Career statistics

Regular season and playoffs

International
1996 Spengler Cup in Davos, Switzerland

Awards

BCJHL

NHL

References

External links

1960 births
Living people
Augsburger Panther players
Battle of the Blades participants
Bellingham Blazers players
Bolzano HC players
Canadian expatriate ice hockey players in Finland
Canadian expatriate ice hockey players in Germany
Canadian expatriate ice hockey players in Italy
Canadian expatriate ice hockey players in Switzerland
Canadian expatriate ice hockey players in the United States
Canadian ice hockey right wingers
Canadian people of Norwegian descent
Canadian people of Swedish descent
Canadian people of Ukrainian descent
Denver Pioneers men's ice hockey players
Edmonton Oilers draft picks
Edmonton Oilers players
HC La Chaux-de-Fonds players
Hockey Hall of Fame inductees
Ice hockey players at the 1980 Winter Olympics
Lukko players
National Hockey League players with retired numbers
New Westminster Bruins players
New York Rangers players
Olympic ice hockey players of Canada
St. Louis Blues players
Seattle Breakers players
Ice hockey people from Vancouver
Stanley Cup champions
Toronto Maple Leafs players